The Women's time trial at the 2003 UCI Road World Championships took place over a distance of  in Hamilton, Ontario, Canada on 8 October 2003.

Final classification

Source

References

Women's Time Trial
UCI Road World Championships – Women's time trial
Road World Championships - Women's Time Trial
2003 in women's road cycling